The 2019 Taça da Liga Final was the final match of the 2018–19 Taça da Liga, the twelfth season of the Taça da Liga. It was played on 26 January 2019 at Estádio Municipal de Braga.

The competition involved the 32 clubs playing in the top two tiers of the Portuguese football league system – 18 from Primeira Liga and 14 from LigaPro – during the 2018–19 season. Reserve sides of Primeira Liga teams that played in the 2018–19 LigaPro were excluded from the competition.

Porto and Sporting CP faced off in the first final involving both teams. After a 1–1 tie, Sporting CP won the final 3–1 after a penalty shootout, thus becoming only the second team (after Benfica) in the competition's history to both defend their title and win multiple Taças da Liga.

Background
For the third consecutive season, this competition featured a final four format with both the semi-finals and the final being played over a space of a few days in the same venue. The Estádio Municipal de Braga hosted all matches. Porto had the chance to win their first Taça da Liga while Sporting CP could be the first team, other than Benfica, to both win the competition multiple times as well as successfully defend the title, having won the previous final.

Route to the final

Being among the top four during the 2017–18 Primeira Liga season, Porto and Sporting CP received byes directly to the third round. Only the top team in each of the four groups advanced to the final four and both teams marginally won their groups. Porto shared the top spot in group C with Chaves both in points and goal difference, the two most important tiebreakers, having only won the group by virtue of more overall goals scored. Meanwhile, Sporting CP had the same number of points in group D as both Estoril and Feirense, having had the best goal difference from the three teams. Porto played in the first semi-final against Benfica winning the match 3–1. The following day Sporting CP drew 1–1 against Braga, the host team, during the 90 minutes in the second semi-final, winning 4–3 on penalties after a series of seven penalty rounds.

Note: In all results below, the score of the finalist is given first (H: home; A: away; N: neutral).

Match

Summary

Details

References

2019
Taca da Liga
FC Porto matches
Sporting CP matches
January 2019 sports events in Europe
Taça da Liga Final 2019